The Naval and Military Club, known informally as The In & Out, is a private members' club located in St James's Square, London. It was founded in 1862 for gentlemen of the British Armed Forces. It now also accepts female members, and members who have not served in the armed forces, but continues to observe service traditions.

Origins
The Club was founded in 1862 by six officers, chiefly from the Buffs, because the three then existing military clubs in London – the United Service, the Junior United Service, and the Army and Navy – were all full.

Premises
The Club was formerly based at Cambridge House at 94 Piccadilly, opposite Green Park. It came to be known as "The In & Out" from the prominent signs on the building's separate vehicle entrance and exit gates. This building was bombed by the Provisional IRA on 11 December 1974. A bomb was thrown into the famous long bar of the club, one steward was injured in the blast, the only casualty of the attack.

In 1996, the club purchased its current premises at 4 St James's Square, designed by Edward Shepherd in 1679 for Anthony Grey, 11th Earl of Kent and the former London home of Waldorf and Nancy Astor from 1912 to 1942. After a programme of refurbishment the club took up occupancy on 1 February 1999. To perpetuate its traditional nickname, the words "In" and "Out" were painted on the two flanking columns of the portico of the house.

In 2011 Cambridge House, in disrepair, was acquired by property tycoons David and Simon Reuben. They planned to convert the Grade I Listed Building into a 48-room private house with a value estimated at £214 million but this plan was axed in 2017 in favour of a 102-room hotel and four serviced apartments.

Facilities
The Club has dining, banqueting and bar facilities, and 52 bedrooms available to members. At the front entrance, in keeping with the traditions of "Clubland", a dress code is observed (jacket and tie for gentlemen, and equivalent for ladies, although "military dress can, of course, also be worn"). The rear entrance in Babmaes Street, just off Jermyn Street, is less formal: it allows direct access to the business centre, gym, swimming pool and "The Goat" bar and brasserie.

The Club co-operates closely with and shares its premises with the Norwegian association Den Norske Klub and the Latin American Canning Club. It also provides a home for the Fleet Air Arm Officers' Association and the International Wine and Food Society.

Membership and subscriptions
The Club's President was Prince Philip, Duke of Edinburgh, who had been a member since 1947.

Notable past members include Prince Louis of Battenberg, Louis Mountbatten, 1st Earl Mountbatten of Burma, Field Marshal the Earl Roberts, John Jellicoe, 1st Earl Jellicoe, Douglas Haig, 1st Earl Haig, Redvers Buller, David Niven, T. E. Lawrence, and Robert Falcon Scott, who is commemorated on the Club's Roll of Honour.

The Club includes a total of thirty-three past members who have been awarded either the Victoria Cross or George Cross. All current recipients of these awards are honorary members of the Club.

Prince Andrew, Duke of York was formerly a member, but resigned in March 2022.

Notable current members include William Astor, 4th Viscount Astor, Khalid bin Sultan, Peter de la Billière, and Peter Wall, who is the current Vice-Chairman.

Membership, long restricted to military officers, now includes those who have not served in the armed forces. Members are, however, expected to respect service traditions.

The Club no longer publicises its fees which are now only made available on receipt of an application form. Prospective members are normally required to have a proposer and seconder, both of whom must be members of two years standing, although in exceptional circumstances the Membership Committee may consider applicants without sponsors, following an interview with the Club Secretary. Serving officers in the armed forces are not required to provide sponsors but are asked to provide evidence of current service.

See also
List of London's gentlemen's clubs

References

Further reading

 (on the architecture and history of the present premises)

 (on the present premises)

External links
 

Gentlemen's clubs in London
1862 establishments in England
Buildings and structures in the City of Westminster
Military of the United Kingdom
Reuben Brothers
Military gentlemen's clubs